A melody is a series or progression of musical notes over time.

Melody or Melodies may also refer to:

People

People with the given name
 Melody Anderson (born 1955), Canadian-American actress and social worker
 Melody Barnes (born 1964), Director of the Domestic Policy Council for Barack Obama's administration
 Melody Beattie (born 1948), self-help author
 Melody Brown (born 1984), musician, member of the musical ensemble The 5 Browns
 Melody Chan, American mathematician
 Melody Currey (born 1950), American politician
 Melody Gardot (born 1985), American musician
 Melody Harris-Jensbach (born 1961), Korean-American manager, deputy CEO and member of the board of Puma
 Melody Horrill (born 1968), weather presenter and reporter with Seven News in Adelaide
Mélody Johner (born 1984) Swiss equestrian
 Melody Kay (born 1979), American actress
 Melody Lacayanga, dancer from So You Think You Can Dance
 Melody McCray-Miller (born 1956), Democratic member of the Kansas House of Representatives
 Melody Perkins (born 1974), actress
 Melody Thomas Scott (born 1956), American actress known for playing "Nikki" on The Young and the Restless
 Melody Thornton (born 1984), member of the Pussycat Dolls

People with the surname
 Tony Melody (1922-2008), English actor

People with the stage name
 Melody (Belgian singer), Nathalie Lefebvre (born 1977), Belgian singer
 Melody (Brazilian singer), Gabriella Abreu Severino (born 2007), Brazilian singer
 Melody (actress) (born 1982), Burmese actress
 Melody (Japanese singer), stylized as "melody.", Melody Ishihara (born 1982), Japanese pop singer
 Melody (Spanish singer), Melodía Ruiz Gutiérrez (born 1990), Spanish singer
 Melody Trouble Vixen, a female professional wrestler from the Gorgeous Ladies of Wrestling
 Melody, a UK garage MC and member of DJ Pied Piper and the Masters of Ceremonies

Arts, entertainment, and media

Fictional entities
 Melody (Hunter × Hunter), a character from the manga series Hunter × Hunter
 Melody Locus, a character in My Life as a Teenage Robot
 Melody Pond, aka River Song, a character in the TV show Doctor Who
 Melody Valentine (also known as Melody Jones), a character in the Josie and the Pussycats franchise
 Princess Melody, a character from the Walt Disney film The Little Mermaid II: Return to the Sea
 Melody Piper, daughter of the Pied Piper from the fashion doll franchise Ever After High
 Melodie the Music Fairy, a character from the book franchise Rainbow Magic
 Melody (My Little Pony), a pony character from the TV series My Little Pony Tales
 Melody-Melody, a character from the 1994 Peanuts special You're in the Super Bowl, Charlie Brown
 Melody, a common potoo from the game Angry Birds 2, introduced in 2022

Film, stage, and television
 Melody (1953 film), a Disney animated film
 Melody (1971 film), a British film, also titled S.W.A.L.K.
 Melody (2014 film), a Belgian drama film
 Melody (TV series), a British animated children's television series
 Melody (2015 film), a Kannada-language film

Music

Albums
 Melodies (album), by Tatsuro Yamashita, released in 1983
 Melody (Joy Electric album), 1994
 Melody (Sharleen Spiteri album), 2008
 Melody (soundtrack), for the 1971 film Melody
 Melodies, a 1977 album by Jan Hammer Group
 Melody, a 2010 EP by Never Shout Never

Songs
 "Melodies", by Madison Beer, 2013
 "Melodies" (song), by GAM, 2006
 "Melody" (Masaharu Fukuyama song), 1993
 "Melody" (Sigala song), 2022
 "Melody", by Lost Frequencies from the 2019 album Alive and Feeling Fine
 "Melody (Sounds Real)", by Ayaka, 2006
 "Melody", by Serge Gainsbourg from the 1971 album Histoire de Melody Nelson
 "Melody", by The Rolling Stones from the 1976 album Black and Blue
 "Melody", by Arash from the 2012 album Superman
 "Melody", by Steve Perry from the 1998 album Greatest Hits + Five Unreleased
 "Melody", by Andy Gibb from the 1978 album Shadow Dancing
 "Melody", a 2015 song by Oliver Heldens
 "Melody", by Blonde Redhead from the 2004 album Misery Is a Butterfly
 "Melody" (Skoryk), a musical composition Myroslav Skoryk

Print and online media
 Melody (magazine), a Japanese shōjo manga magazine published
 Melody (radio station), a Malaysian radio station
 Melody, a 1966 novel by V. C. Andrews
 Melody, a blog engine that forked from Movable Type
 Melody 105.4 FM, a radio station in London later rebranded Magic 105.4
 Melody Radio (Bulgaria), a radio station
 Melody TV network owned by Ethnic Channels Group, including: Melody Aflam, Melody Drama and Melody Hits

Other uses 
 Melody 34, a French sailboat design
 Melody (building), building in Miami, Florida, United States
 Melody (grape), a type of wine grape
 Melody potato, a potato cultivar
 MSC Melody, an Italian cruise ship that repelled pirates in April 2009
 Melody (given name)

See also
 Melodia (disambiguation)
 My Melody (disambiguation)

English feminine given names